Heitor Villa-Lobos's Étude No. 6, one of his Twelve Études for Guitar, was first published by Max Eschig, Paris, in 1953.

Structure
The piece is in E minor and is marked Poco allegro

Analysis

Étude No. 6 is a chord study opening with heavily accented chords in a pattern suggesting the Argentine tango .

References

Cited sources

Further reading
 Wright, Simon. 1992. Villa-Lobos. Oxford Studies of Composers. Oxford and New York: Oxford University Press.  (cloth);  (pbk).

Compositions by Heitor Villa-Lobos
Guitar études
Compositions in E minor